A list of films produced in the Soviet Union in 1940 (see 1940 in film).

1940

See also
1940 in the Soviet Union

1940
Lists of 1940 films by country or language
Films